Vegard Bjerkreim Nilsen (born 2 September 1993) is a Norwegian cross-country skier.

He made his World Cup debut in January 2014 in the Nove Mesto sprint, also collecting his first World Cup points with a 19th place. He improved with every World Cup outing, first a 16th place in March 2014 in Drammen, then a 12th place in January 2015 in Otepää, then an 8th place in February 2015 in Östersund. However, he never broke the top 30 again.

He represents the sports club Lillehammer SK. He hails from Kristiansand is a younger brother of Betty Ann Bjerkreim Nilsen.

Cross-country skiing results
All results are sourced from the International Ski Federation (FIS).

World Cup

Season standings

References 

1993 births
Living people
Sportspeople from Kristiansand
Norwegian male cross-country skiers